Descurainia sophia is a member of the family Brassicaceae. Common names include flixweed, herb-Sophia and tansy mustard. It reproduces by seeds. It is a dominant weed in dark brown prairie and black prairie soils of southern Alberta. It was once given to patients with dysentery and called by ancient herbalists Sophia Chirurgorum, "The Wisdom of Surgeons". It is the type species of the genus Descurainia (named for French botanist and herbalist François Descurain (1658–1749)) and of the rejected genus Sophia Adans.

Culinary use
In Iran, the seeds are called khak-e shir (khakshir), and khak-e shir drinks are traditionally favored as thirst quencher during hot summer days. Khakshir is also considered a medicinal substance in traditional Iranian medicine, consumed in varying combinations with other herbs and substances to gain effects ranging from antidiuretic to aphrodisiac.

China has a tradition of eating this plant, and its eating method is recorded in the Jiuhuang Bencao.

Cultural
In German, it is called the Sophienkraut and associated with Saint Sophia of Rome, who was invoked against late frosts.

References

sophia
Plants described in 1753
Taxa named by Carl Linnaeus
Flora of Malta